Tasty, stylized as TASTY, was a K-pop duo formed by Woollim Entertainment in 2012. The group was composed of identical twins Daeryong and Soryong. They made their debut in August 2012 with the single album Spectrum. In 2015, they terminated their contract with Woollim Entertainment and went back to China.Since then, they changed the group name to Hanch兄弟(Hanchtwins).

History

2006–11: Training under JYP Entertainment 
Prior to their debut under Woollim Entertainment, the duo were trainees under another South Korean agency, JYP Entertainment from 2006–2011. During this time, they spent time in the U.S., where they trained with choreographers that had worked with Beyoncé and Ne-Yo. They also appeared as backup dancers for the singer and founder of JYP Entertainment, Park Jin-young.

The duo made the decision to leave the agency after five years in training, citing in an interview with Newsen the difficulty of seeing other trainees debut before them.

2012–13: Debut with Spectrum, Spectacular, and "Day n Night" 
Tasty made their debut under Woollim Entertainment on August 9, 2012, with the single "You Know Me (너 나 알아)". Their corresponding debut single album was written and composed by Rphabet and consisted of four tracks.

A year later, on August 7, 2013, Tasty released the single "MAMAMA", a fusion of swing and hip hop composed by Singaporean producer Tat Tong. The single's lyrics were written by Hoya and Dongwoo of Infinite H, who also featured in the music video. The corresponding four-track single album Spectacular featured a collaboration with rapper Hanhae from Phantom.

On November 27, 2013, Tasty released the single "Day 'n Night (떠나가)". The music video was shot in Hong Kong and featured actress and model Esom as the female protagonist.

2015: Departure from Woollim Entertainment
On July 15, 2015, Tasty announced via their personal Weibo account that they would be moving back to China and ceasing to promote in Korea. Woollim Entertainment claimed to be uninformed of their one-sided decision, and had recently been in discussions with the duo about their scheduled comeback. Tasty refuted these claims and expressed dissatisfaction with the company's management. The duo then promoted in China under the name DLXL.

Discography

Single albums

Singles

Concerts and tours

As participating act
2013: SM Town Live World Tour III
2014: SM Town Live World Tour IV

As supporting act
2012: INFINITE 2012 ARENA TOUR in JAPAN (Second Invasion Evolution PLUS)
2013-2014: Girls' Generation World Tour Girls & Peace

Videography

Music videos

Awards and nominations

References

External links

Woollim Entertainment artists
K-pop music groups
Musical groups established in 2012
South Korean boy bands
South Korean dance music groups
Chinese expatriates in South Korea
Musical groups from Seoul
South Korean musical duos
Sibling musical duos
Twin musical duos
2012 establishments in South Korea